Calybites is a genus of moths in the family Gracillariidae.

Species
Calybites hauderi (Rebel, 1906)  
Calybites lepidella (Meyrick, 1880)  
Calybites phasianipennella (Hübner, [1813])  
Calybites quadrisignella (Zeller, 1839)  
Calybites securinella (Ermolaev, 1986)  
Calybites trimaculata Kumata, 1982

External links
 Global Taxonomic Database of Gracillariidae (Lepidoptera)

Gracillariinae
Gracillarioidea genera
Taxa named by Jacob Hübner